St. Mark's Episcopal Cathedral may refer to:

 St. Mark's Episcopal Cathedral (Minneapolis), Minnesota
 St. Mark's Cathedral (Salt Lake City), Utah
 St. Mark's Episcopal Cathedral, Seattle, Washington

See also
 St. Mark's Episcopal Church (disambiguation)
 St. Mark's Church (disambiguation)
 St. Mark's (disambiguation)
 Saint Mark's Cathedral (disambiguation)
 Saint Mark's Cathedral (disambiguation)
 Saint Mark's Coptic Orthodox Church (disambiguation)
 St Mark's Basilica